Tenterfield was an electoral district of the Legislative Assembly in the Australian state of New South Wales, originally created in 1859, partly replacing New England and Macleay, and named after, and including, Tenterfield. In 1920, with the introduction of proportional representation, it was absorbed into Northern Tablelands, along with Armidale and Gough. It was recreated in 1927 and abolished in 1981 and partly replaced by the recreated Northern Tablelands.

Members for Tenterfield

Election results

References

Former electoral districts of New South Wales
Constituencies established in 1859
1859 establishments in Australia
Constituencies disestablished in 1920
1920 disestablishments in Australia
Constituencies established in 1927
1927 establishments in Australia
Constituencies disestablished in 1981
1981 disestablishments in Australia
New England (New South Wales)